Hellinsia carphodactyla (also known as the citron plume) is a moth of the family Pterophoridae, first described by Jacob Hübner in 1813. It is known from most of Europe (except Scandinavia), Asia Minor and North Africa.

Description
Adults are on wing in June, and again in August and September in two generations in western Europe.

The larvae of the first generation live in the stem of ploughman's spikenard (Inula conyza). The second brood feed on the flowers and seeds overwintering in the larval stage. Larvae have also been recorded on Inula bifrons, Inula hirta, Inula montana, Carlina species, including carline thistle (Carlina vulgaris) and ox-eye (Buphthalmum salicifolium).

Pupation takes place in the excavated stem parts.

References

External links
 microlepidoptera.nl

carphodactyla
Moths described in 1813
Plume moths of Africa
Plume moths of Asia
Plume moths of Europe
Taxa named by Jacob Hübner